Raju Narayan Todsam was a member of the 13th Maharashtra Legislative Assembly. He represents the Arni Assembly Constituency. He belongs to the Nationalist Congress Party.

On 28 November 2015, Todsam was arrested for abusing and assaulting an employee of the Maharashtra State Electricity Distribution Company Limited in 2013.

References

Maharashtra MLAs 2014–2019
Bharatiya Janata Party politicians from Maharashtra
Living people
People from Yavatmal district
Marathi politicians
Year of birth missing (living people)